Ana Verónica Ramos Morales is a Bolivian economist, university professor, and former general manager of the  (BDP).

Biography
Verónica Ramos was born in La Paz, the daughter of the renowned economist, writer and former prefect of La Paz Department, . In 1983, she entered the Faculty of Economics of the Higher University of San Andrés (UMSA), graduating with a licentiate in economics in 1988.

In 1994, she earned a master's in agricultural development (CIDES-UMSA), and in 2008 she earned a doctorate in social economy (CEE-UMSA).

She also participated in several research projects of different institutions related to the field of economics.

Minister of Productive Development (2015–2017)
On 22 January 2015, President Evo Morales appointed Verónica Ramos as the country's new , replacing Ana Teresa Morales.

In May 2015, bakeries in La Paz and El Alto began a cessation of activities, paralyzing the distribution of bread and causing a confrontation over its shortage at the headquarters of the Bolivian government. Minister Ramos maintained that the strike was unjustified since the bakers' objective was to raise the price of bread to 50 centavos per unit. During the dispute, her ministry's Food Production Support Company (EMAPA) sold bread to citizens at 40 centavos per unit. EMAPA also sold meat to citizens during a strike by butchers and retailers over new tax rules the following month.

Ramos remained in the position for two years, handing over the ministry to her successor, Eugenio Rojas Apaza, on 23 January 2017.

References

Government ministers of Bolivia
Bolivian economists
Higher University of San Andrés alumni
Living people
Movement for Socialism (Bolivia) politicians
People from La Paz
Bolivian women economists
Women government ministers of Bolivia
Year of birth missing (living people)
21st-century Bolivian women politicians
21st-century Bolivian politicians